The 1979 NSL Cup Final was the final match of the 1979 NSL Cup. It was played at the Olympic Sports Field in Adelaide, Australia, on 30 September 1979, contested by Adelaide City and St George Budapest. Adelaide City won the match 3–2.

Route to the final

Adelaide City

St George Budapest

Match

Details

References

NSL Cup Finals
September 1979 sports events in Australia
Soccer in Adelaide
Adelaide City FC